Christian Busch (8 January 1880 – 29 March 1977) was a German gymnast. He competed in three events at the 1904 Summer Olympics.

References

External links
 

1880 births
1977 deaths
German male artistic gymnasts
Olympic gymnasts of Germany
Athletes (track and field) at the 1904 Summer Olympics
Gymnasts at the 1904 Summer Olympics
Sportspeople from Wuppertal